"You Were Always There" is a song written and recorded by American country music artist Donna Fargo. It was released in May 1973 as the second single from the album My Second Album.  The song was Fargo's fourth hit on the country chart and her fourth number one. The single stayed at number one for a single week and spent a total of twelve weeks on the chart.

Charts

Weekly charts

Year-end charts

References

1973 singles
Donna Fargo songs
Songs written by Donna Fargo
Dot Records singles
1973 songs